Tetracha davidsoni is a species of tiger beetle that was described by Naviaux in 2007, and is endemic to Brazil.

References

Cicindelidae
Beetles described in 2007
Endemic fauna of Brazil
Beetles of South America